Jessica Lu is an American actress. She is best known for her portrayal of Ming Huang on the MTV television series Awkward.

Early life
Jessica Lu was born and raised in Schaumburg, a northwest suburb of Chicago, Illinois. Her parents are from South Korea, with her father being Chinese and Japanese, and her mother Chinese. They speak English, Mandarin, and Korean at home. Her father is a photographer, and her mother, a singer; and since their arrival in the United States, they have run a restaurant together.

Lu has been a natural performer since early childhood. At 6 years old, she started dancing, specializing in ballet, tap, and jazz. After seeing Kristi Yamaguchi and Michelle Kwan in the Olympics on television, she pursued figure skating, taking private lessons every morning at 4 am before school. She also had singing, piano, and violin lessons. Growing up in, and having her parents’ restaurant as her stage with a daily rotating audience, Jessica would entertain each table with a theatrical reading, violin playing, a tap dance, or a song.

She started modeling and acting, and became a sought after child talent in Chicago by the time she was 10 year old, working on ad campaigns such as Calvin Klein, Oshkosh, Marshall Fields, Got Milk?, and Chicago Place, as well as commercials for McDonald's, Ford Motors, Orville Redenbacher's, Samsung, and Kaiser Permanente.

She graduated from Columbia College Chicago with a degree in Musical Theatre Performance.

Career
Lu moved to Los Angeles, California in 2008. Soon after, she was cast in the role of Ming Huang on the critically acclaimed MTV series Awkward. Other work followed, in both drama and comedy, including roles such as an insufferable hipster opposite Kathy Bates on FX's American Horror Story: Hotel, for which Popsugar listed her as one of “The 25 Best American Horror Story Guest Stars”; an upscale escort opposite Tim Robbins on HBO's Here and Now, with a performance that The A.V. Club wrote was “one of the subtlest, best motivated characters”; an adoring admirer opposite Ashton Kutcher and Jon Cryer on CBS's Two and a Half Men; and a lovesick teenager with a terminal illness on FOX's Red Band Society.

In 2018, Lu played tech genius CEO Alexis Barrett on NBC's Reverie, starring alongside Sarah Shahi, Dennis Haysbert, Sendhil Ramamurthy and Kathryn Morris. IndieWire called her a “promising scene stealer” in the pilot episode. SYFYWIRE, as well as other fan sites, expressed their appreciation for Lu's performance week after week, and she quickly became a favorite character. TVLine gave her a "Performer of the Week" honorary mention by the last episode of the first season, for her “tender performance”. Jessica co-starred on the CBS television drama God Friended Me as Joy.

Filmography

Theater
 Flower Drum Song — Lead
 West Side Story — Supporting
 Ragtime! — Supporting/Ensemble

References

External links 
 
 Saving the Human Race on CW Seed; in Norwegian

21st-century American actresses
Living people
Actresses from Illinois
Actresses from Los Angeles
American female models
American actresses of Chinese descent
American stage actresses
American television actresses
Columbia College Chicago alumni
People from Schaumburg, Illinois
Female models from Illinois
Year of birth missing (living people)